The Confederación de Trabajadores de Costa Rica (CTCR) is a trade union centre in Costa Rica.

It is affiliated with the World Federation of Trade Unions.

References

Trade unions in Costa Rica
World Federation of Trade Unions